Aspartic alpha-decarboxylase may refer to:
 Aspartate 1-decarboxylase, an enzyme
 Glutamate decarboxylase, an enzyme